Nelsonianthus is a genus of flowering plants belonging to the family Asteraceae.

It is native to southern Mexico and Guatemala.

The genus name of Nelsonianthus is in honour of Edward William Nelson (1855–1934), an American naturalist and ethnologist. It was first described and published in Phytologia Vol.27 on page 54 in 1973.

Known species
Acccording to Kew:
Nelsonianthus epiphyticus 
Nelsonianthus tapianus

References

Senecioneae
Asteraceae genera
Plants described in 1973
Flora of Mexico
Flora of Guatemala